Warren County Courthouse may refer to:

 Warren County Courthouse (Georgia), Warrenton, Georgia
 Warren County Courthouse (Indiana), Williamsport, Indiana
 Warren County Courthouse (Iowa), Indianola, Iowa
 Warren County Courthouse (Kentucky), Bowling Green, Kentucky
 Old Warren County Courthouse, Vicksburg, Mississippi
 Warren County Courthouse (Mississippi), Vicksburg, Mississippi, a Mississippi Landmark
 Warren County Courthouse and Circuit Court Building, Warrenton, Missouri
 Warren County Courthouse (New Jersey), Belvidere, New Jersey
 Old Warren County Courthouse Complex, Lake George, New York
 Warren County Courthouse (Pennsylvania), Warren, Pennsylvania
 Warren County Courthouse (Virginia), Front Royal, Virginia